Peter Brock (born November 1936) is an American automotive and trailer designer, author and photojournalist, who is best known for his work on the Shelby Daytona Cobra Coupe and Corvette Sting Ray.

Early life and education

Peter Elbert Brock (named Elbert after his grandfather E. J. Hall, co-designer of the Liberty L-12 engine and co-founder of Hall-Scott Motor Car Company) grew up primarily in the Sausalito area of northern California.  When he was 16 years old he saved up to buy a 1949 MG from the back of the shop where he worked.  In addition to the work Brock did on the car, he painted it white so the car's livery would match the U.S. international racing colors of blue and white.

Brock was first exposed to professional racing when he went to his first road race at Pebble Beach, California in 1951, photographing cars and drivers, including Phil Hill in the 1952 race, but was still too young for a racing driver's license since the SCCA minimum age requirement was 21 at that time.

Soon after, his family moved to Menlo Park. He started looking for something faster than his MG and found a half-completed 1946 Ford convertible on a used car lot.  He started in on the customization of the Ford, which included converting the livery into the white and blue American racing scheme (white car with two blue stripes down the center). While still in high school, he won the Oakland Roadster show with the car, by then referred to as "the Fordillac" because of the Cadillac engine Brock had installed.  Brock won the show again with the car in 1956, months before he left California for General Motors in Detroit.

Upon graduating from high school, he enrolled at Stanford University in the engineering department.  He subsequently dropped out, and later drove to Los Angeles to enroll at what was then called the Art Center School, later known as the Art Center College of Design in Pasadena, California. When asked for his portfolio, he had brought no drawings with him, so instead returned to his car, made some drawings of hot rod cars in his ring binder, returned to the admissions office and presented his "portfolio", and was admitted.

Career

General Motors
At age 19, while still attending Art Center School, Brock became the youngest designer ever hired by General Motors' GM Styling design department. In November 1957, Brock drew the sketch (with genesis in the Merrill Powell designed Victress C2) which GM VP of Design Bill Mitchell picked to become the design of the next Corvette, the Corvette Stingray. As GM had made a commitment to not engage in racing (known as the AMA ban) Brock worked with Mitchell in 1958 in one of the design studios, creating the prototype of the Stingray racer. The production car was renamed the Sting Ray and was released in 1963, almost 4 years after Brock had left GM.

Shelby American
Having turned 21, which allowed him to obtain his SCCA race license, Brock left GM in 1959 to return to California.  In Detroit he'd been working on a mid-1950s Cooper that had run at Le Mans.  Returning to California with the Cooper, he started working for Max Balchowsky at Max's Hollywood Motors shop during the day and worked on his race car at night. In 1961 Carroll Shelby and Paul O'Shea met at Riverside Raceway to discuss opening a driver's school.  When Shelby and O'Shea got into a disagreement about who would work for who, O'Shea left.  Shelby hired Brock as his first paid employee, running the Carroll Shelby School of High Performance Driving.  Brock worked at Shelby American until the end of the 1965 season on the Shelby American brand, creating the logos, merchandise, ads, and car liveries.  He designed the Shelby components of the Shelby Mustang GT350s and designed race cars for Shelby such as the Lang Cooper, Nethercutt Mirage, De Tomaso P70 and the Shelby Daytona Cobra coupes that won the FIA GT World Championship in 1965.

Brock Racing Enterprises
In December 1965 Brock started his own design firm and motor racing team, Brock Racing Enterprises (BRE) which worked with Hino, Toyota, and Datsun. GT cars Brock designed for BRE clients included the Hino Samurai, the Toyota JP6 and the Triumph TR-250K. Brock continued racing, now driving his own Lotus 11 MKII and paid rides with a TVR and Mercury in the NASCAR series.  Brock began performance development on the Hino 900, which then evolved into their Hino 1300 Contessa. When Toyota took over Hino, Brock designed for them the JP6 Prototype. Toyota planned to give BRE several Toyota 2000GTs for use in Trans-Am racing, but when Toyota instead gave the cars to Carroll Shelby, Brock approached Datsun. BRE became the west coast Datsun factory race team and competed in 1969 in the SCCA DP class with Datsun 2000 roadsters, in 1970 and 1971 in the CP class with the 240Zs (SCCA National Champions '70-'71) and in 1971-72 the 2.5 Trans-Am Series races with the Datsun 510s (National Champions '71-'72).  The race team was disbanded at the end of the 1972 season when Brock moved on to hang gliding.

Ultralite Products
Brock founded Ultralite Products, which he built into the largest hang gliding company in the world, and developed the sport of long distance hang gliding competition. He then left the company, citing dissatisfaction with liability laws, and returned to the automotive industry.

Instructor, author and photographer
Brock became an instructor at his alma mater, Art Center College of Design in Pasadena, California.  In the early 1990s he wrote a book on the Daytona Cobra Coupes, then worked for 21 years as a photojournalist, primarily covering endurance racing for automotive magazines.  In 2013, he wrote Corvette Sting Ray: Genesis of an American Icon on the development of the 1963 Corvette.

In 1999 Brock worked at the Hi-Tech company in Port Elizabeth, South Africa to create a modern version of Daytona Cobra Coupe, called the Brock Coupe. Over 150 Brock Coupes have been produced in South Africa and sold by Superformance, LLC (Superformance Replicars).  He owns an example of the coupe (chassis #0073) painted Amulet Red with a Wimbledon White half-cove.

Present

Brock now lives in Henderson, Nevada in the Las Vegas Valley area with his wife Gayle, working together as freelance automotive writers and racing photographers.

Brock also continues to design clay models of new automotive designs. In 2008, Brock designed an aerodynamic car trailer called the Aerovault, with aluminum construction.

Gayle runs the current day BRE operation which offers memorabilia from the 1960s and 1970s, builds the  Aerovault car trailers and offers aftermarket parts and accessories for Datsuns and Daytona Coupe replicas.

Awards and recognition
In 2010, the International Society for Vehicle Preservation presented Brock with their International Automotive Media Lifetime Achievement Award.

Later that same year, the Art Center College of Design awarded Brock their Lifetime Achievement Award for "Outstanding accomplishment in the fields of automotive design, technology, innovation, motorsports and journalism".

In 2012, BRE received a Commendation from the City of Henderson for "their contributions to the automobile industry and in appreciation of their community support."

Brock, in January 2013, was awarded the Phil Hill Award by the Road Racing Drivers Club (RRDC).  The RRDC presents the Phil Hill Award for outstanding service to road racing.  Brock was presented the award at the Daytona Speedway by Bobby Rahal.

In 2017, Brock was inducted into the Sports Car Club of America Hall of Fame.  

Articles on Brock's career have appeared in Classic Motorsports, Automobile, MotorTrend Classic, Grassroots Motorsports and Car & Driver magazines.

References

External links
Biographical profile
Brock Racing Enterprises

American racecar constructors
Motoring writers
1936 births
Living people